Morchies is a commune in the Pas-de-Calais department in the Hauts-de-France region of France.

Geography

Population

Places of interest
 The church of St.Vaast, rebuilt, as was all of the village, after World War I.
 The three Commonwealth War Graves Commission cemeteries.

See also
Communes of the Pas-de-Calais department

References

External links

 The CWGC British cemetery
 The CWGC Australian cemetery
 The CWGC Communal cemetery

Communes of Pas-de-Calais